Hillbilly Elegy: A Memoir of a Family and Culture in Crisis is a bestselling 2016 memoir by J. D. Vance about the Appalachian values of his Kentucky family and the social and socioeconomic problems of his hometown of Middletown, Ohio, where his mother's parents moved when they were young.

In 2020 it was adapted into a film directed by Ron Howard and starring Glenn Close and Amy Adams.

Summary
Vance describes his upbringing and family background while growing up in the city of Middletown, Ohio. He writes about a family history of poverty and low-paying, physical jobs that have since disappeared or worsened in their guarantees, and compares this life with his perspective after leaving it.

Though Vance was raised in Middletown, his mother and her family were from Breathitt County, Kentucky. Their Appalachian values include traits like loyalty and love of country, despite social issues including violence and verbal abuse. He recounts his grandparents' alcoholism and abuse, and his unstable mother's history of drug addictions and failed relationships. Vance's grandparents eventually reconciled and became his de facto guardians. He was pushed by his tough but loving grandmother, and eventually Vance was able to leave Middletown to attend Ohio State University and Yale Law School.

Alongside his personal history, Vance raises questions such as the responsibility of his family and people for their own misfortune. Vance blames hillbilly culture and its supposed encouragement of social rot. Comparatively, he feels that economic insecurity plays a much lesser role. To lend credence to his argument, Vance regularly relies on personal experience. As a grocery store checkout cashier, he watched welfare recipients talk on cell phones although the working Vance could not afford one. His resentment of those who seemed to profit from poor behavior while he struggled, especially combined with his values of personal responsibility and tough love, is presented as a microcosm of the reason for Appalachia's overall political swing from strong Democratic Party to strong Republican affiliations. Likewise, he recounts stories intended to showcase a lack of work ethic including the story of a man who quit after expressing dislike over his job's hours and posted to social media about the "Obama economy", as well as a co-worker, with a pregnant girlfriend, who would skip work.

Publication
The book was popularized by an interview with the author published by The American Conservative in late July 2016. The volume of requests briefly disabled the website. Halfway through the next month, The New York Times wrote that the title had remained in the top ten Amazon bestsellers since the interview's publication.

Vance credits his Yale contract law professor Amy Chua as the "authorial godmother" of the book.

Reception
The book reached the top of The New York Times Best Seller list in August 2016 and January 2017. 

American Conservative contributor and blogger Rod Dreher expressed admiration for Hillbilly Elegy, saying that Vance "draws conclusions…that may be hard for some people to take. But Vance has earned the right to make those judgments. This was his life. He speaks with authority that has been extremely hard won." The following month, Dreher posted about why liberals, Dreher states, loved the book. New York Post columnist and editor of Commentary John Podhoretz described the book as among the year's most provocative. The book was positively received by conservatives such as National Review columnist Mona Charen and National Review editor and Slate columnist Reihan Salam.

By contrast, other journalists criticized Vance for generalizing too much from his personal upbringing in suburban Ohio. Jared Yates Sexton of Salon criticized Vance for his "damaging rhetoric" and for endorsing policies used to "gut the poor." He argues that Vance "totally discounts the role racism played in the white working class's opposition to President Obama." Sarah Jones of The New Republic mocked Vance as "the false prophet of Blue America," dismissing him as "a flawed guide to this world" and the book as little more than "a list of myths about welfare queens repackaged as a primer on the white working class." Historian Bob Hutton wrote in Jacobin that Vance's argument relied on circular logic and eugenics, ignored existing scholarship on Appalachian poverty, and was "primarily a work of self-congratulation." Sarah Smarsh with The Guardian noted that "most downtrodden whites are not conservative male Protestants from Appalachia" and called into question Vance's generalizations about the white working class from his personal upbringing.

The New York Times wrote that Vance's direct confrontation of a social taboo is admirable regardless of whether the reader agrees with his conclusions. The newspaper writes that Vance's subject is despair, and his argument is more generous in that it blames fatalism and learned helplessness rather than indolence. 

A 2017 Brookings Institution report noted that, "JD Vance's Hillbilly Elegy became a national bestseller for its raw, emotional portrait of growing up in and eventually out of a poor rural community riddled by drug addiction and instability." Vance's account anecdotally confirmed the report's conclusion that family stability is essential to upward mobility. The book provoked a response in the form of an anthology, Appalachian Reckoning: A Region Responds to Hillbilly Elegy, edited by Anthony Harkins and Meredith McCarroll. The essays in the volume criticize Vance for making broad generalizations and reproducing myths about poverty.

A key reason for Hillbilly Elegy's widespread popularity following its publication in 2016 was its role in explaining Donald Trump's rise to the top of the Republican Party. In particular, it purported to explain why white working class voters became attracted to Trump as a political leader. Vance himself offered commentary on how his book provides perspective on why a voter from the "hillbilly" demographic would support Trump. Although he does not mention Trump in the book, Vance openly criticized the now-former president while discussing his memoir in interviews following its release. However, Vance walked these comments back when he joined the 2022 U.S. Senate race in Ohio and now openly embraces Trump ideology.

Film adaptation

A film adaptation was released in select theaters in the United States on November 11, 2020, then digitally on Netflix on November 24. It was directed by Ron Howard and stars Glenn Close, Amy Adams, Gabriel Basso and Haley Bennett. Although a few days of filming were planned for the book's setting of Middletown, Ohio, much of the filming in the summer of 2019 was in Atlanta, Clayton and Macon, Georgia, using the code name "IVAN."

References

External links
 
 C-SPAN Q&A interview with Vance on Hillbilly Elegy, October 23, 2016

2016 non-fiction books
American memoirs
HarperCollins books
English-language books
Sociology books
Books about Ohio
Memoirs adapted into films
Appalachian culture in Ohio
Rural society in the United States
Middletown, Ohio
Memoirs about alcoholism